The Briggs & Stratton Vanguard Big Block V-Twin is a series of American piston engines, designed and produced by Briggs & Stratton of Wauwatosa, Wisconsin for use in commercial applications. They have also been adapted for use as ultralight aircraft engines.

Design and development
The engine is a V-twin four-stroke,  or  displacement, fan-driven air-cooled, gasoline engine design. In aviation applications it is used as a direct drive engine, turning a propeller without a reduction drive. It employs a single electronic ignition system and produces  at 3600 rpm.

Variants
Vanguard Big Block V-Twin 895cc
Vanguard Big Block V-Twin 993cc

Applications

Bautek Skycruiser
Parazoom Trio-Star Delta
Spacek SD-1 Minisport

Specifications (31 hp model)

See also

References

External links

Briggs & Stratton aircraft engines
Air-cooled aircraft piston engines
2010s aircraft piston engines